Mars Area High School is a high school located in Mars, Pennsylvania.

Notable alumni 
 David Bednar, Major League Baseball (MLB) pitcher
 Chloe Lukasiak, Dance Moms Cast Member and Famous Dancer, Actress and Author
Will Bednar, Mississippi State Baseball pitcher

References

1967 establishments in Pennsylvania
Education in Pittsburgh area
Educational institutions established in 1967
Mars, Pennsylvania
Public high schools in Pennsylvania
Schools in Butler County, Pennsylvania